The Copa del Generalísimo 1947 Final was the 45th final of the King's Cup. The final was played at the Estadio Riazor in La Coruña, on 22 June 1947, being won by Real Madrid CF, who beat RCD Español 2–0 after extra time.

Details

References

1947
Copa
RCD Espanyol matches
Real Madrid CF matches